Iaijutsu is a Japanese koryū martial art founded by Tamiya Heibei Narimasa in the late 16th century.

Lineages 

Three main lineages are usually recognized as being from Tamiya-ryū: Ko Tamiya-ryū, Kishū Tamiya-ryū and Shin Tamiya-ryū.
However, while traditionally accepted as accurate, such classification may be subject to some level of criticism, since Shin Tamiya-ryū is a style on its own, founded by Wada Heisuke and both Ko Tamiya-ryū and Kishū Tamiya-ryū refer to the lineage transmitted in the Kishū domain (now Wakayama Prefecture).

Ko Tamiya-ryū (古田宮流)

 Founder: Hayashizaki Jinsuke Shigenobu 林崎甚助重信
 1st generation: Tamiya Heibe Narimasa (Shigemasa) 田宮平兵衛業正
 2nd generation: Tamiya Tsushima-no-kami Nagakatsu 田宮対馬守長勝
 3rd generation: Tamiya Hyōenojō Nagaie 田宮兵衛尉長家
 4th generation: Tamiya Sannosuke Tomonari 田宮三之助朝成
 5th generation: Tamiya Jirōemon Narimichi 田宮次郎右衛門成道

It is accepted that this lineage got extant after Narimichi left no descendants.
However, there is a document stating that Kishū Tamiya-ryū is the legitimate heir to Ko Tamiya-ryū.

Tamiya-ryū lineage to Shin Tamiya-ryū (新田宮流)

 Founder: Hayashizaki Jinsuke Shigenobu 林崎甚助重信
 1st generation: Tamiya Heibe Narimasa (Shigemasa) 田宮平兵衛業正
 2nd generation: Miwa Genbe 三輪源兵衛
 3rd generation: Yamamoto Matabe Shōmu 山下又(亦)兵衛生夢 
 4th generation: Asahina Sukeemon Mudō 朝比奈助右衛門夢道
 5th generation: Wada Heisuke Masakatsu 和田平助正勝, founder of Shin Tamiya-ryū

Kishū Tamiya-ryū (紀州田宮流)

The lineage widely recognized today as Tamiya-ryū is a branch of Kishū Tamiya-ryū, also called Tamiya Shinken-ryū.
Another lineage that branched from Kishū Tamiya-ryū was Kubota-ha Tamiya-ryū, which had Kubota Sugane as its most famous practitioner. Shingai Tadaatsu(真貝忠篤, 1842-1920), one of the forefront leaders of Dai Nippon Butokukai, is from this lineage.

Kubota-ha Tamiya-ryū (窪田派田宮流)
 Founder: Tamiya Heibe Narimasa (Shigemasa) 田宮平兵衛業正
 1st generation: Tamiya Tsushima-no-kami Nagakatsu 田宮対馬守長勝
 2nd generation: Tamiya Hyōenojō Nagaie 田宮兵衛尉長家 
 3rd generation: Tamiya Sannosuke Tomonari 田宮三之助朝成
 4th generation: Saiki San'emon Kiyokatsu 斉木三右衛門清勝
 5th generation: Rogi Ihachirō Takahiro 露木伊八郎高寛
 6th generation: Tsukahara Jūrōzaemon Masakatsu 塚原十郎左衛門昌勝
 7th generation: Hirano Shōhachi Naokata 平野匠八尚賢
 8th generation: Kubota Suketarō Sugane 窪田助太郎清音

The Tamiya-ryū/Tamiya Shinken-ryū is a lineage that got widespread in Iyo Saijō domain (now city of Saijo in Ehime Prefecture), when Matsudaira Yorizumi (1641-1711), son of Tokugawa Yorinobu (lord of Kishū domain) and nephew of Tokugawa Ieyasu, became the first Iyo Saijō domain lord, taking along with him Eda Gizaemon, a remarkable master of Tamiya-ryū, and Tsumaki Motouemon Mototaka, a master of military strategy.
Tsumaki's son was Tsumaki Junjiro Motoaya, who inherited the style in the 8th month of 1797 (9th year of the Kansei Era). Since then, the Tsumaki family has kept the lineage, generation after generation.

Tamiya-ryū/Tamiya Shinken-ryū (田宮神剣流)
 Founder: Tamiya Heibe Narimasa (Shigemasa) 田宮平兵衛業正
 1st generation: Tamiya Tsushima-no-kami Nagakatsu 田宮対馬守長勝
 2nd generation: Eda Gizaemon 江田儀左衛門 
 3rd generation: Miyake Shūi 三宅集意
 4th generation: Kurimoto Hanzō 栗本半蔵
 5th generation: Sanno Bangorō Takamitsu 三野伴五郎高満
 6th generation: Toyota Nakazaemon 豊田仲左衛門
 7th generation: Toyota Chikazaemon 豊田近左衛門
 8th generation: Tsumaki Junjirō Motoaya 妻木順次郎元賁
 9th generation: Tsumaki Nobuhira 妻木信平
 10th generation: Tsumaki Heinojō Motoshige 妻木平之丞元茂
 11th generation: Tsumaki Ataka Motonari (Gensei) 妻木恰元成
 12th generation: Tsumaki Kōtarō Motoatsu (Genkō) 妻木興太郎右元厚
 13th generation: Tsumaki Yoshio Gensei 妻木義雄元誠
 14th generation: Tsumaki Seirin Motonobu (Genshin) 妻木正麟元信

Current lineages

After Tsumaki Seirin Genshin's passing away on June 4, 2006, Tsumaki Gentatsu became the next representative(daihyō) of Tamiya-ryū, and his lineage is officially recognized and registered with Nihon Kobudō Kyōkai and Nihon Kobudō Shinkōkai.

Tsumaki Seirin's eldest son, Tsumaki Genwa, parted ways and is now heading his own organization, the Tamiya-ryū Genwakai. The US and Canada branches of Tamiya-ryū are affiliated with the Genwakai.

And there is another lineage who follows the steps of Fukui Seiichi (1924-2016), an elder disciple of Tsumaki Seirin. They identify themselves as Odawara Tamiya-ryū and the European branch of Tamiya-ryū is affiliated with this lineage. Its current leader is Katsumata Ken'ichi.

Techniques

Currently, Tamiya-ryū has 11 techniques in its first set (Omote no maki) and 14 in the second and last set (Koran no maki). Also, there are 10 paired techniques, called as Tachitai.

Tsumaki Seirin also added kenbu (martial dance with sword and fan) and shigin (Japanese poetry declamation) to the curriculum.

Odawara Tamiya-ryū have developed new sets of techniques based on their research of Kubota Sugane's writings, introducing 11 techniques classified as Chūden (middle transmission) and 3 techniques classified as Ougi (supreme technique).

References
 
 
 
 
 
 
 
 

Ko-ryū bujutsu
Japanese martial arts